The Professional Footballers Australia Women's Footballer of the Year (often called PFA Women's Footballer of the Year) is an annual award given to the player who is adjudged to have been the best of the year in Australian soccer. The award has been presented since the 2009–10 season and the winner is chosen by a vote amongst the members of the players' trade union, Professional Footballers Australia (PFA). The current holder is Steph Catley, who won the award on 30 September 2020.

The first winner of the award was Sydney FC goalkeeper Servet Uzunlar. As of 2020, Sam Kerr, Elise Kellond-Knight, and Lydia Williams have won the award on multiple occasions, and only Kerr has won the award in consecutive seasons. Kerr has won the award a record five times.

The award is open to players playing in the W-League and Australian players playing overseas. No non-Australian player has won the award as of 2020, though many of the players have played in other countries.

Winners
The award has been presented on ten occasions as of 2020, with six different winners.

Breakdown of winners

By country

See also
 PFA Footballer of the Year Awards

References

External links
PFA official website
W-League official website

Australian soccer trophies and awards
Awards established in 2010
Women's association football trophies and awards